The 1995–96 Virginia Tech Hokies men's basketball team represented Virginia Polytechnic Institute and State University from Blacksburg, Virginia in the 1995-96 season.

In their first season in the Atlantic-10 Conference, the Hokies finished with a conference record of 13-3, first in the A-10 west division. After falling to John Calipari's Massachusetts in the A-10 tournament, the Hokies received an at-large bid to the NCAA tournament, where they would beat Green Bay in the first round, before falling to Rick Pitino's eventual National Champion Kentucky in the Round of 32.

Tournament results
A-10 Tournament
3/7/96 Quarterfinal Vs. Rhode Island - L, 71-77 @ Philadelphia Convention Hall, Philadelphia, PA
NCAA Tournament
3/14/96 First Round Vs. Green Bay - W, 61-48 @ Reunion Arena, Dallas, TX
3/16/96 Round of 32 Vs. Kentucky - L, 60-84 @ Reunion Arena, Dallas, TX

Rankings

References

Virginia Tech Hokies men's basketball seasons
Virginia Tech
Virginia Tech
1995 in sports in Virginia
1996 in sports in Virginia